Death's Shadow may refer to:

 Death's Shadow (Midsomer Murders), an episode of the TV series Midsomer Murders
 Death's Shadow (novel), a 2008 novel by Darren Shan